The Andrew Scott House is a historic two-story farmhouse in Culleoka, Tennessee, U.S.

History
The house was built circa 1820 for Andrew Scott and his wife, Mary Doak Matthews. It was designed in the Georgian architectural style, with touches of Palladian architecture. After Andrew Scott's death in 1870, it was inherited by his son, Robert Miles Scott, who lived in the house with his wife, Sarah M. Walker, and their nine children. It became a horse farm.

After Robert M. Scott's 1897 death, it was purchased by J. T. Petty. By January 1939, it was purchased by Allan Matthews and his wife Mary. It was inherited by her nephew, Elliott Matthews, in 1978, and purchased by Philip M. Wendts in 1991.

The house has been listed on the National Register of Historic Places since August 4, 1995.

References

Houses on the National Register of Historic Places in Tennessee
Georgian architecture in Tennessee
Houses completed in 1820
Houses in Maury County, Tennessee
Antebellum architecture